Microrasbora microphthalma is a species of cyprinid that is endemic to small hill streams in Yunnan, China. It belongs to the genus Microrasbora, which contains small danionins.

References

Fish described in 2008
Danios
Microrasbora
Freshwater fish of China